I'll Get Along may refer to:

 I'll Get Along (horse), a Thoroughbred racehorse
 "I'll Get Along" (song), a 2012 song by Michael Kiwanuka